Giampietro Stocco (born 1961) is an Italian science fiction and alternate history author.

Stocco was born in Rome. He got graduated from with a degree in Political Sciences at the Università di Roma "La Sapienza" with a thesis about the national and ethnic minorities in Europe, with a special focus on the cases of South Tyrol and Schleswig-Holstein. He studied for a master's degree in contemporary history in Denmark, Odense University, at Roskilde Universitetscenter and Institute of regional Studies  in Aabenraa. He lives and works in Genoa, as a journalist in RAI, the Italian public TV-service.

Bibliography 
Nero Italiano (novel, Fratelli Frilli Editori, 2003)
Dea del Caos (novel,  Fratelli Frilli Editori, 2005)
Figlio della Schiera (novel, Chinaski, 2007)
Dalle mie ceneri (novel, Delos Books, 2008)
Nuovo Mondo (novel, Bietti Edizioni, 2010)
Dolly (novel, Zerounoundici Edizioni, 2012)
La corona perduta (novel, Cordero Editore, 2013)

1961 births
Living people
Writers from Rome
Italian science fiction writers
Italian male writers